John Dixon (1785 – 1857) was a British Whig politician.

Dixon became a Whig Member of Parliament for Carlisle at the 1847 general election, but was the next year unseated due to "several acts of treating" at his election. Although he stood at the resulting by-election, he ranked third and was defeated.

References

External links
 

UK MPs 1847–1852
Whig (British political party) MPs for English constituencies
1785 births
1857 deaths